Hermine Baron (November 1, 1912 – September 27, 1996) was an American contract bridge player who was a Grand Life Master. 

A native of Omaha, Nebraska, she moved to Los Angeles in the mid-1940s.  Having contracted polio at an early age, she played the game from a wheelchair. At her death, she had accumulated 22,654 masterpoints, the most of any woman in the USA.  Winner of several national titles and over 100 regional events, she also represented the USA internationally in 1968, 1978 and 1982. 

Baron died in West Hollywood, California, in 1996. was inducted into the ACBL Hall of Fame in 2002.

Playing record
 Grand Life Master with 22,654.52 masterpoints — the most of any woman in the U.S. at the time of her death in 1996
 Helen Sobel Smith Trophy: Life Master's Women's Pairs winner in 1963 with Anne Burnstein
 McKenney Trophy (now the Barry Crane Top 500): won in 1964 and 1970.  Her 1964 winning total of 1370 masterpoints was an all-time record subsequently broken in 1969
 Sternberg Trophy (formerly the Coffin Trophy): Women's Board-a-Match Teams winner in 1964 with Mary Jane Farell, Bee Schenkin and Peggy Solomon  and in 1968 with Mary Jane Farell, Sally Johnson, Bee Schenkin, Peggy Solomon and Rhoda Walsh; runner-up in 1967 with Mary Jane Farell, Bee Schenkin and Peggy Solomon and in 1974 with Carol Greenhut, Trudi Nugit, and Kerri Shuman
 Von Zedtwitz Gold Cup: Life Master Pairs winner with Meyer Schleifer in 1966
 Whitehead Trophy: Women's Pairs winner in 1968 with Rhoda Walsh and in 1982 with Beverly Rosenberg; runner-up in 1967 with Marilyn Johnson, in 1975 with Carol Greenhut and in 1977 and 1980 with Beverly Rosenberg
 Cavendish Trophy: Blue Ribbon Pairs runner-up in 1971 with Michael Lawrence
 Represented the United States in world competition in 1968, 1978, and 1982

Bridge accomplishments

Honors

 ACBL Hall of Fame, 2002

Wins

 North American Bridge Championships (7)
 von Zedtwitz Life Master Pairs (1) 1966 
 Whitehead Women's Pairs (2) 1968, 1982 
 Smith Life Master Women's Pairs (1) 1963 
 Wagar Women's Knockout Teams (2) 1964, 1968 
 Keohane North American Swiss Teams (1) 1979

Runners-up

 North American Bridge Championships (8)
 Whitehead Women's Pairs (4) 1967, 1975, 1977, 1980 
 Blue Ribbon Pairs (1) 1971 
 Hilliard Mixed Pairs (1) 1961 
 Wagar Women's Knockout Teams (2) 1967, 1974

Notes

References

External links
 
 

1912 births
1996 deaths
American contract bridge players
People from Los Angeles
People from Omaha, Nebraska
People with polio